James Charlton Farm is a historic home located near Radford, Montgomery County, Virginia.  The house dates to the early-19th century, and is a two-story, square, log dwelling with a four-room plan.  It is sheathed in weatherboard, and features a pair of coursed rubble double-shouldered chimneys linked by a stone wall approximately five feet high.  Also on the property are the contributing coursed rubble stone chimney, a board-and-batten meathouse, a frame drive-through corn crib, a frame barn, and two frame garages.

It was listed on the National Register of Historic Places in 1989.

References

Houses on the National Register of Historic Places in Virginia
Houses in Montgomery County, Virginia
National Register of Historic Places in Montgomery County, Virginia